Amberton University is a private Evangelical Christian university in Garland, Texas. It began as part of Abilene Christian University as an extension campus from 1971 until 1982 and was initially located in Mesquite, Texas, moving to Garland in 1974.  Plans for its separation into an independent institution were initiated when the school received accreditation from the Southern Association of Colleges and Schools in 1981 and it became known as Amber University in 1982, with the "ton" being added to its name in 2001.  A branch campus was opened in Frisco, Texas, in 2006.

History
In September 1971, Amberton University began as an extension campus of Abilene Christian University and was located in Mesquite. From the beginning, the university's purpose was to identify and provide for the educational needs of the community. Quickly, the university turned to educational programs that catered to working adults.

In June 1974, the campus location was moved to Garland. The new campus, a two-story professional office building, was designed for mature adults who did not need or desire the environment associated with traditional colleges (dormitories, cafeterias, gymnasiums, intramural athletics, etc.).

In 1981, the university received accreditation from the Commission on Colleges of the Southern Association of Colleges and Schools, and plans were approved for separating the institution from Abilene Christian University. The separation was completed in June 1982, and the university took the name Amber University.

In 2001, the university changed its name to Amberton University. The English addition of “ton” to a word means a town or village. As a result of offering adult students traditional lecture and nontraditional e-courses, the name more accurately identifies the community of learners.

Amberton University's Garland campus is located on a five-acre site. The facility is a 60,000-square-foot office complex designed to provide a secure, professional environment conducive to adult learning. In January 2006, Amberton opened a new center in Frisco to better serve students in Collin County.

Notably, Amberton is the only private university in Texas that allows holders of concealed carry permits to carry firearms on its campus. The state passed a law requiring all public universities to allow concealed carry on campus (with narrow exceptions) that took effect in 2016, but allowed private institutions to opt out. Amberton chose to allow campus carry because of its nontraditional student body.

Students
Amberton is aimed at the "nontraditional student", that is students who are above the age of 21.  This term  also is often used to encompass married students, students working full-time, students seeking a second bachelor's degree, or students who have worked for a significant time in one field and are seeking education in a new field.  Amberton University does not sponsor athletic teams nor does it operate many of the adjunct facilities typical of U.S. higher education such as dormitories.  Amberton does not admit students under age 21.  It requires all its students to be fluent in the English language prior to enrolling.   Amberton offers distance learning programs and degrees, consisting of courses taught by the resident faculty. The school awards credit for "life learning" for some undergraduate students, as is compliant with regional accreditation standards, but never for graduate students.

Accreditation
Amberton University is regionally accredited by the Southern Association of Colleges and Schools, one of the six regional accreditation organizations recognized by the US Department of Education and the Council for Higher Education Accreditation. While the school upholds a Christian philosophy, it promises its students complete freedom of conscience; no particular doctrinal creed or formulation must be professed to study there or to graduate.

References

External links
Official Site

Universities and colleges affiliated with the Churches of Christ
Universities and colleges in the Dallas–Fort Worth metroplex
Education in Garland, Texas
Educational institutions established in 1971
Universities and colleges accredited by the Southern Association of Colleges and Schools
Universities and colleges in Dallas County, Texas
1971 establishments in Texas
Private universities and colleges in Texas